O. rex  may refer to:
 Oecomys rex, the regal oecomys or king arboreal rice rat, a rodent species found in Guyana, Suriname, French Guiana and nearby parts of Venezuela and Brazil
 Ogasawarana rex, a land snail species endemic to Japan
 Othnielia rex, a hypsilophodont dinosaur species

See also
 Rex (disambiguation)